Switchblade Symphony was an American rock band from San Francisco, California. Their music combined orchestral sounds with heavy synth sequences and ethereal vocals to create a union of classical music and gothic rock.

History 
Switchblade Symphony was formed in 1989 by composer Susan Wallace and vocalist Tina Root. The band's name refers to the cutting up elements of classical music to mix them with harder sounds.

They released their first album in 1995 on the Cleopatra Records label. They also had two live guitarists, first Robin Jacobs (who later joined Razor Skyline) and then George Earth (most recently of Small Halo, also with Tina Root), and three live drummers, first Eric Gebow (now with Blue Man Group), Justin Clayton, and then Scott van Shoick.

The band's second album, Bread and Jam for Frances, was released in 1997. The album peaked at #119 on the CMJ Radio Top 200.

Switchblade Symphony disbanded in November 1999. Subsequently, Tina Root started Tre Lux. In 2008, Tina Root and George Earth formed Small Halo, a band based out of Los Angeles, California.

Their song "Clown" was featured in the 1998 film Wicked starring Julia Stiles. Their song "Gutter Glitter" was also featured in an episode of The Boulet Brothers' Dragula.

Discography

Albums and EPs 
 Serpentine Gallery (1995)
 Scrapbook (1997) (EP) (out of print)
 Bread and Jam for Frances (1997)
 The Three Calamities (1999)
 Sinister Nostalgia (2001) (remixes)
 Sweet, Little Witches (2003) (live performances and video track)
 Serpentine Gallery Deluxe (2005)

Singles 
 "Clown" (1996)
 "Drool" (1997)

Other 
 Fable (1991) (out of print demo cassette)
 Elegy (1992) (out of print demo cassette)
 "Girlscout" (single) (recorded with Jack Off Jill) (1998)

Compilation albums 
 From the Machine, featured the song: "Mine Eyes" (Index Records, 1990)
 Gothic Rock Volume 2: 80's Into 90's (1995)
  Gothik (1995) (re-released in 2006)
 Wired Injections (1996)
 Gothic Divas Presents: Switchblade Symphony, Tre Lux, and New Skin (Cleopatra, 2006)
 Psycho Tina's Hell House Of Horrors, featured the song "Witches (Live)" (Cleopatra)
 Burning From the Outside: Retail Slut, featured the song "Clown  (Razed In Black Vs. Transmutator Remix) " (Cleopatra, 2007)
 The Devil's Songbook, featured the song "Wicked" (2010)
 Virgin Voices 2, A Tribute to Madonna, featured the song "Lucky Star"

References

External links 
 Tre Lux – Tina Root's new band
 Cleopatra Records – Switchblade Symphony's record label

Rock music groups from California
Musical groups from San Francisco
Trip hop groups
American gothic rock groups
Musical groups established in 1989